

Medal summary

Men

Women

Mixed

Medal table

External links
 2011 Southeast Asian Games

2011 Southeast Asian Games events